CC18 may ref to:

CubCrafters CC18-180 Top Cub, an American light aircraft design
Bukit Brown MRT station, a future MRT station in Singapore that will have the code CC18